The 1911 West Virginia Mountaineers football team was an American football team that represented West Virginia University as an independent during the 1911 college football season. In its fourth and final season under head coach Charles Augustus Lueder, the team compiled a 6–3 record and outscored opponents by a total of 91 to 67.  Ernest Bell was the team captain.

Schedule

References

West Virginia
West Virginia Mountaineers football seasons
West Virginia Mountaineers football